Giving Thanks is an American Public Media radio special that airs nationwide on Thanksgiving Day. It is hosted by John Birge. The show consists of classical music, songs, and dramatic readings all related to Thanksgiving. Although the format remains the same, some individual features are always aired, notably, selections from Charles Laughton's 1962 album The Story Teller, about his experiences with Etienne Houvet and Alfred Manessier at Chartres Cathedral, as well as his reading from Jack Kerouac's The Dharma Bums. Musical pieces regularly included are Handel's Largo from Xerxes and music from Aaron Copland's Appalachian Spring.

Although John Birge began doing an annual Thanksgiving program in 1985, Giving Thanks did not go national until 1999, two years after he began working for American Public Media. Birge states on the website for the program that Thanksgiving is his favorite holiday.

References

Giving Thanks from American Public Media Website 

American Public Media programs

1985 radio programme debuts